UNeDocs, or United Nations electronic Trade Documents, was a planned document standard for global electronic trade within UN/CEFACT. The project was suspended and placed under review in 2009 by the UN/CEFACT Bureau.

UNeDocs' goal was to provide a single adaptable electronic document for trade transactions. Due to the standardizations, users could automate various documentation tasks.

Later on, a UNeDocs 2.0 was passed, and now plays a responsibility in the (CBRDM) Cross Border Reference Data Model.
In the complicated process, UNeDocs is part of National Data Harmonization and Cross Border Data Exchange

References

External links 
 Official site from August 28, 2009 on the Internet Archive
 Official site from September 29, 2009 on the Internet Archive, after UNeDocs was suspended.
 Official site from May 4-6, 2015

International trade documents
United Nations documents
Suspended United Nations documents